Kazimír Gajdoš (28 March 1934 – 8 November 2016) was a Czechoslovak international footballer who played as a right winger.

He was born in Brusno near Banská Bystrica on 28 March 1934. During his club career he played for Tatran Prešov, Slovan Bratislava and Slovnaft Bratislava. He earned 4 caps for the Czechoslovakia national football team in 1957, and was in his nation's squad for two World Cups, although he played in neither. He died in Bratislava on 8 November 2016 after a serious illness.

He played mostly as a right winger.

Notes

References

External links

1934 births
Slovak footballers
Czechoslovak footballers
Czechoslovakia international footballers
People from Banská Bystrica District
Sportspeople from the Banská Bystrica Region
Association football forwards
1954 FIFA World Cup players
1958 FIFA World Cup players
1. FC Tatran Prešov players
ŠK Slovan Bratislava players
FK Inter Bratislava players
2016 deaths